Jonathan Ruiz may refer to:

 Jonathan Ruiz (footballer, born 1982), Spanish footballer
 Jonathan Ruiz (footballer, born 1995), Aruban international football player